Bibiyana Gas Field is a natural gas field at Habiganj, Bangladesh. It is a subsidiary of Chevron (Bangladesh), a leading US multinational company in the oil and gas sector.

Location

Bibiyana gas field is located in Kasba, Dighalba Union of Nabiganj Upazila of Habiganj District in Sylhet division.

See also 
List of natural gas fields in Bangladesh
Bangladesh Gas Fields Company Limited
Gas Transmission Company Limited

References 

1981 establishments in Bangladesh
Economy of Sylhet
Natural gas fields in Bangladesh
Habiganj District